Park Jae-Hong (born 6 April 1990) is a South Korean footballer who plays as centre back for Bucheon FC 1995 in K League Challenge.

Career
Park was selected by Bucheon FC in the 2013 K League draft. He made 32 appearances and a goal in his debut season.

References

External links 

1990 births
Living people
Association football defenders
South Korean footballers
Bucheon FC 1995 players
K League 2 players
Yonsei University alumni